The Catalina 22 is an American trailerable sailboat that was designed by Frank V. Butler and first built in 1969.

The Catalina 22 is one of the most produced boats in its size range and achieved an unparalleled commercial success.

Production
The design is built by Catalina Yachts in the United States and was at one time built by Cooper Enterprises in Canada.

The Catalina 22 has also been manufactured in Australia and marketed as the Boomaroo 22 before being relaunched as the Catalina 22. The design was produced in Europe as the Alacrity 22 (later known as the Jaguar 22) manufactured in the United Kingdom.

Design

The Catalina 22 is a recreational keelboat, built predominantly of fiberglass, with teak wood trim. It has a masthead sloop rig, a raked stem, a vertical transom, a large self-bailing cockpit, with under-seat lockers, a transom-hung rudder controlled by a tiller and a fixed fin keel. It has two winches for the jibsheets. Sails include a jib, 150% genoa and a spinnaker.

Models have been built with folding swing keels, wing keels and fin keels.

The boat is normally fitted with a small  outboard motor for docking and maneuvering.

Accommodations include a forward "V" berth with a privacy curtain and a port berth with an optional head that can be stowed underneath. The main cabin area includes a dinette table and a molded fiberglass galley that rolls away under the cockpit space. The foredeck features an opening hatch for ventilation. The companionway hatch may have a "pop-top" fitted for additional headroom.

Variants
Catalina 22
This model was introduced in 1969. A fixed keel version was introduced in the 1970s. The fixed keel version of the boat has a PHRF racing average handicap of 270 with a high of 280 and low of 243.
Catalina 22 "New Design"
This model was introduced in 1986 and produced until 1995. It features an optional wing keel.
Catalina 22 Mark II
This model was introduced in 1995 and produced until 2004.
Catalina 22 Sport
This model was introduced in 2004 and remains in production. It was originally called the Capri 22 swing keel. It was built "in response to Catalina 22 owners’ requests for a production boat that more accurately reflects the original dimensions and weight of this popular one design boat..." Built with new "fairer" molds, it matches the dimensions and hull shape of the original. Optional equipment includes a 135% and 150% genoas, self-tailing winches and a highway trailer.

Operational history
By 1994 there were 70 racing fleets across the US.

Awards

The Catalina was inducted into the now-defunct Sail America American Sailboat Hall of Fame in 1995. In honoring the design the hall cited, "Simplicity, trailerability, durability and the endearing and enduring qualities of the Catalina 22 helped to launch the trailer sailing market. Although many other designs have entered the fray, this pocket cruiser remains at the top of the mobile sailing heap ... The Catalina 22 has defined the pocket-cruising trailerable class for the last 25 years. With stalwart sailing qualities, an exceptional builder, fanatic owner support and a strong class association, the boat's future is assured."

The design was named Sail magazine's "best small cruiser for trailering".

See also

List of sailing boat types

Similar sailboats
Buccaneer 220
Capri 22
DS-22
Falmouth Cutter 22
Hunter 22
J/22
Marlow-Hunter 22
Marshall 22
Nonsuch 22
Pearson Electra
Pearson Ensign
Ranger 22
Santana 22
Seaward 22
Spindrift 22
Starwind 223
Tanzer 22
Triton 22
US Yachts US 22

References

External links 

Keelboats
1960s sailboat type designs
Sailing yachts
Trailer sailers
Sailboat type designs by Frank Butler
Sailboat types built by Catalina Yachts
Sailboat types built by Cooper Enterprises